Michael Maguire (born 23 August 1965) is an Irish retired Gaelic footballer who played as a goalkeeper for the Cork senior team.

Maguire joined the team during the 1984 championship and was a regular sub goalkeeper until his retirement after the 1998 championship. During that time he won two All-Ireland medals as a non-playing substitute. 

At club level Maguire is a three-time Munster medalist with Castlehaven. In addition to this he has also won two county club championship medals.

References

1965 births
Living people
Castlehaven Gaelic footballers
Cork inter-county Gaelic footballers